Růžena Nasková (28 November 1884 – 17 June 1960) was a Czechoslovak film actress. She appeared in 15 films between 1915 and 1953.

Selected filmography
 The Magic House (1939)
 Auntie's Fantasies (1941)
 Old Czech Legends (1953)

References

External links
 

1884 births
1960 deaths
Actresses from Prague
People from the Kingdom of Bohemia
Czech film actresses